MVM's Panditrao Agashe School or Panditrao Agashe School, is a private, co-educational day school located at Law College Road in Pune, India. The institution is a part of the Maharashtra Vidhya Mandal. Maharashtra Vidhya Mandal was founded in 1957 . He was the one of the first Maharashtrian in Pune to start an English Medium School. He is also renowned for his English into Marathi and Marathi into English dictionaries.
The school caters to pupils from kindergarten up to class 10 and the medium of instruction is the English language. The school is affiliated to the Maharashtra State Board of Secondary and Higher Secondary Education, Pune which conducts the SSC Examinations at the close of class 10. The school is divided into three sections viz. pre-primary, primary and secondary.

Panditrao Agashe

The school's name sake is Jagdish "Panditrao" Agashe (1936 – 1986) the elder brother of the late business magnate Shri. Dnyaneshwar Agashe, eldest son of industrialist Shri. Chandrashekhar Agashe. He served as the managing director of the Brihan Maharashtra Sugar Syndicate Ltd. after his father.

See also
List of schools in Pune

References

External links

Schools in Pune
Educational institutions established in 1957
1957 establishments in Bombay State
Private schools in Maharashtra